Teague Barn Wabash Importing Company Farm Stable, also known as the Miller Barn, is a historic bank barn located in Noble Township, Wabash County, Indiana.  Its original section was built in 1861, and is a three-story, post-and-beam frame barn on a limestone foundation. It measures 40 feet by 80 feet and features a paneled frieze and soffit, sunburst gable vent, and chamfered support posts.

It was listed on the National Register of Historic Places in 2002.

References

Barns on the National Register of Historic Places in Indiana
Commercial buildings completed in 1861
Buildings and structures in Wabash County, Indiana
National Register of Historic Places in Wabash County, Indiana